Jazz rap (also jazz hop or jazz hip hop) is a fusion of jazz and hip hop music, as well as an alternative hip hop subgenre, that developed in the late 1980s and early 1990s. AllMusic writes that the genre "was an attempt to fuse African-American music of the past with a newly dominant form of the present, paying tribute to and reinvigorating the former while expanding the horizons of the latter." The rhythm was rooted in hip hop over which were placed repetitive phrases of jazz instrumentation: trumpet, double bass, etc. Groups involved in the formation of jazz rap included A Tribe Called Quest, Digable Planets, De La Soul, Gang Starr, The Roots, Jungle Brothers, and Dream Warriors.

Overview
During the 1970s, The Last Poets and Gil Scott-Heron placed spoken word and rhymed poetry over jazzy backing tracks. There are also parallels between jazz and the improvised phrasings of freestyle rap. Despite these disparate threads, jazz rap did not coalesce as a genre until the late 1980s.

History
In 1989, Gang Starr released the debut single "Words I Manifest", sampling Dizzy Gillespie's 1952 "Night in Tunisia", and Stetsasonic released "Talkin' All That Jazz", sampling Lonnie Liston Smith. Gang Starr's debut LP, No More Mr. Nice Guy (Wild Pitch, 1989), and their track "Jazz Thing" (CBS, 1990) for the soundtrack of Mo' Better Blues, further popularized the jazz rap style. In 1992 Eric B & Rakim used wood bass on "Don't Sweat the Technique".

Digable Planets' 1993 release Reachin' (A New Refutation of Time and Space) was a hit jazz rap record sampling the likes of Don Cherry, Sonny Rollins, Art Blakey, Herbie Mann, Herbie Hancock, Grant Green, and Rahsaan Roland Kirk. It spawned the hit single "Rebirth of Slick (Cool Like Dat)". Also in 1993, Us3 released Hand on the Torch on Blue Note Records. All samples were from the Blue Note catalogue. The single "Cantaloop" was Blue Note's first gold record.

Post WWII swing and modern jazz had fused with the introduction of Black appeal radio which attracted a younger audience through its reliance on jive idioms, rhyming, and cadence laden rap verses. Dizzy Gillespie had pointed to The jives of Dr. Hepcat and rhyming D.J. Daddy-O Daylie as key to popularizing modern jazz. The rise of Top-40 radio on the strength of the rapping DJs in this period of radio's rebirth among black youth led to the wider use of language and syntax popularizing rap. Muhammad Ali's phrasing to the press in the early part of his career was born of listening to black radio of the 1950s, which was often white radio announcers speaking slang "jive" and imitating black announcers while withholding the fact on air of their backgrounds. Pioneering DJs Al Benson, Nat D., and Jack the Rapper all used rhyming, the dozens and jive talk to pepper their broadcasts and were widely copied by white DJs like John Richbourg, Gene Nobles, and Bill Allen during the 1950s, and whose influence on James Brown and other godfathers of rap was formative, bebop was the backing track that modern jazz credits with being the foundation black appeal radio is based on.

Native Tongues
Groups making up the collective known as the Native Tongues tended toward jazzy releases: these include the Jungle Brothers' debut Straight Out the Jungle (Warlock, 1988) and A Tribe Called Quest's People's Instinctive Travels and the Paths of Rhythm (Jive, 1990) and The Low End Theory (Jive, 1991). The Low End Theory has become one of hip hop's most acclaimed albums, and also earned praise from jazz bassist Ron Carter, who played double bass on one track. De La Soul's Buhloone Mindstate (Tommy Boy, 1993) featured contributions from Maceo Parker, Fred Wesley, and Pee Wee Ellis, and samples from Eddie Harris, Lou Donaldson, Duke Pearson and Milt Jackson.

Also of this period was Toronto-based Dream Warriors' 1991 release And Now the Legacy Begins (Island). It produced the hit singles "My Definition of a Boombastic Jazz Style" and "Wash Your Face in My Sink". The first of these was based on a loop taken from Quincy Jones' "Soul Bossa Nova", while the second sampled Count Basie's 1967 rendition of "Hang On Sloopy". Meanwhile, Los Angeles hip hop group Freestyle Fellowship pursued a different route of jazz influence in recordings with unusual time signatures and scat-influenced vocals.

Jazz artists come to hip hop
Though jazz rap had achieved little mainstream success, jazz legend Miles Davis' final album (released posthumously in 1992), Doo-Bop, featured hip hop beats and collaborations with producer Easy Mo Bee. Jazz musician Branford Marsalis  collaborated with Gang Starr's DJ Premier on his Buckshot LeFonque project that same year. Between 1993 and 2000 fellow Gang Starr member Guru released Jazzmatazz, which featured guest appearances from jazz artists such as Lonnie Liston Smith, Freddie Hubbard and Donald Byrd, amongst others.

1994–present
Musical jazz references became less obvious and less sustained, and lyrical references to jazz certainly more rare. However, jazz had been added to the palette of hip hop producers, and its influence continued throughout the 1990s whether behind the gritty street-tales of Nas (Illmatic, Columbia, 1994), or backing the more bohemian sensibilities of acts such as The Roots, The Nonce, and Common. Since 2000 it can be detected in the work of producers such as J. Rawls, Nujabes, Fat Jon, Madlib, Kero One, and the English duo The Herbaliser. A project somewhat similar to Buckshot Le Fonque was Brooklyn Funk Essentials, a New York-based collective who also released their first LP in 1994. Prince himself contributed to the genre on some songs from 1991 to 1992, as well as with his New Power Generation album Gold Nigga, which mixed jazz, funk and hip-hop and was released very confidentially.

One hip hop project which continued to maintain a direct connection to jazz was Guru's Jazzmatazz series, which used live jazz musicians in the studio. Spanning from 1993 to 2007, its four volumes assembled jazz luminaries like Freddie Hubbard, Donald Byrd, Courtney Pine, Herbie Hancock, Kenny Garrett and Lonnie Liston Smith, and hip hop performers such as Kool Keith, MC Solaar, Common, and Guru's Gang Starr colleague DJ Premier.

Madlib's 2003 release Shades of Blue paid homage to his Blue Note Records roots, where he samples from Blue Note's archives. The album also contains interpretations of Blue Note classics performed by Yesterdays New Quintet.

In 2006, Bay Area producer/rapper Kero One independently released a jazz and funk influenced hiphop album named Windmills of the Soul, which stood out for infusing live saxophone, jazz guitar, electric piano, and other instruments with dusty samples and compelling lyrics, eventually selling over 30,000 copies worldwide and playing heavy rotation on college radio stations worldwide.

In September 2014, Statik Selektah released his album What Goes Around with a notable jazz rap influence, unique among the actual rap atmosphere. Another recent jazz rap talent producer is Beats by the Pound (also known as The Medicine Men). In February 2015, Canadian jazz band Badbadnotgood released 'Sour Soul' with Wu-Tang Clan rapper Ghostface Killah. A month later, Kendrick Lamar released To Pimp a Butterfly, which incorporates jazz, funk, and spoken word. In 2015, Irish rapper Kojaque released a series of jazz rap instrumentals on SoundCloud.

References

See also 
 Jazz Funk
 Soul jazz
 Malcolm X

 
Fusion music genres
Hip hop genres
Jazz genres
Jazz fusion